The Journal of Environmental Management is a semi-monthly peer-reviewed scientific journal covering research on environmental science and quality that was established in 1973. It is published by Elsevier and the editors-in-chief are Raf Dewil (KU Leuven), Jason Evans (Stetson University), and Lixiao Zhang (Beijing Normal University).

History

The journal absorbed Advances in Environmental Research which was published between 1997 and 2004. The open access journal Environmental Challenges, published since 2020, is a companion journal.

Abstracting and indexing
The journal is abstracted and indexed in:

According to the Journal Citation Reports, the journal has a 2021 impact factor of 8.910, ranking it 34th out of 279 journals in the category "Environmental Sciences".

References

External links 

Elsevier academic journals
Publications established in 1973
English-language journals
Environmental science journals
Semi-monthly journals